Iran Zendan (Iran Prison) is a feature film by Daryush Shokof about the situations of political prisoners currently in Iran. The film is a semi-documentary picture with images taken from the actual events during the mass protests of the 2009 Iranian presidential election and what happens to some of protesters after they are incarcerated. Iran Zendan was first screened in Babylon theatres in Berlin, Germany on May 9, 2010.

Scriptwriter/producer/star Daryush Shokof was kidnapped by 4 terrorists in the city of Cologne in May 2010 and was kept for over 12 days. He was kidnapped for having made 2 films, Iran Zendan and Hitler's Grave and was told to stop releases of both movies or else he would be killed. Shokof has been under close protection from German police forces ever since his release. He has since made Iran Zendan available free of charge on the internet.

Credits
 Daryush Shokof: Script, production design, producer
 Daryoush Zandi: music
 Brendan Flynt: Camera
 Daryoush Zandi: editor
 Mahnaz Talebitari: Production Manager
 Mahnaz Talebitari: Line Producer
 Hasan Demirci: producer
 Shaheen Shokoofandeh: producer

Production Design
 Daryush Shokof
 Brendan Flynt

Cast

 Daryush Shokof
 Mahnaz Talebitari
 Hossein Daryani
 Hasan Demirci
 Mehtap Yigit-Özer
 Sivan Salim
 Jahangir Bordjian
 Stefanija Basargina
 Pedram Shoushi
 Tuna Erol
 Marcia Moraes
 Murat Demirci
 Fardi Demirci

Production

The film was produced by Daryush Shokof, and Shahin Shokoofandeh in Berlin, Germany.

References

External links
 
 http://www.stopthebomb.net
 http://www.iraania.com/?p=21293
 http://www.casttv.com/video/hm6pc81/iran-zendan-video
 http://www.magiran.com/npview.asp?ID=2007320
 http://www.farsnews.net/newstext.php?nn=8809290151
 http://www.iran-newspaper.com/1388/9/29/Iran/4391/Page/2/Index.htm

Iranian drama films
2010 films
2010 drama films
Films directed by Daryush Shokof